Ziklag is the biblical name of a town that was located in the Negev region in the south-west of what was the Kingdom of Judah. It was a provincial town within the Philistine kingdom of Gath when Achish was king. Its exact location has not been identified with any certainty.

Identification
At the end of the 19th century, both Haluza (by Wadi Asluj, south of Beersheba) and Khirbet Zuheiliqah (located north-west of Beersheba and south-southeast of Gaza city) had been suggested as possible locations. Khirbet Zuheiliqah was identified by Conder and Kitchener as the location on the basis of Ziklag being a corruption of Zahaliku, whence also Zuheiliqah.

The more recently proposed identifications for Ziklag are:
Due to this identification, for some time Lahav was officially named Tzekleg.
Tell esh-Sharia (Arabic) or Tel Sera (Hebrew). In June 2020, Prof. Moshe Garsiel and Dr. Bath-Sheva Garsiel suggested that since the name of the Tell as well as the Wadi, both mean "law" in Arabic, it commemorates David's law of sharing the spoils of war between the warriors and the ones who are left behind, which occurred in the vicinity (1 Sam 30: 22–26).
Tel Zayit
Khirbet a-Ra‘i in the Shephelah, close to modern-day Kiryat Gat, proposed in 2019 by excavating archaeologist Yosef Garfinkel and contested mainly on grounds of biblical geography and lacking name continuity by Aren Maeir and Israel Finkelstein..

In the Bible

Philistine's original base
The Book of Genesis (in ) refers to Casluhim as the origin of the Philistines. Biblical scholars regard this as an eponym rather than an individual, and it is thought possible that the name is a corruption of Halusah; with the identification of Ziklag as Haluza, this suggests that Ziklag was the original base from which the Philistines captured the remainder of their territory. It has also been proposed that Ziklag subsequently became the capital of the Cherethites.

Tribal allotment
In the lists of cities of the Israelites by tribe given in the Book of Joshua, Ziklag appears both as a town belonging to the Tribe of Judah and as a town belonging to the Tribe of Simeon. Textual scholars believe that these lists were originally independent administrative documents, not necessarily dating from the same time, and hence reflecting the changing tribal boundaries.

David receives Philistine Ziklag
1 Samuel 30 claims that by the time of David, the town was under the control of Philistines, but subsequently was given by their king – Achish – to David, who at that time was seemingly acting as a vassal of the Philistines. David requested "a place in one of the country towns" and was awarded Ziklag, which he used as a base for raids against the Geshurites, the Girzites, and the Amalekites, which he conducted away from the oversight of Achish. David's reports to Achish state that he had been conducting raids on Saul's lands in southern Judah and on the Jerahmeelites.

Biblical scholars argue that the town was probably on the eastern fringe of the Philistines' territory, and that it was natural for it to be annexed to Judah when David became king. Since the compilation of the Book of Joshua is regarded by textual scholars as late, probably being due to the deuteronomist, it is possible that the tribal allocations given within it date from after this annexation rather than before.

David and the Amalekites
According to 1 Samuel 30, while David was encamped with the Philistine army for an attack on the Kingdom of Israel, Ziklag was raided by Amalekites; the Amalekites burning the town, and capturing its population without killing them (scholars think this capture refers to enslavement). However, none of the archaeological sites which have been proposed to be Ziklag show any evidence of destruction during the era of David.

In the narrative, when David's men discovered that their families had been captured, they became angry with David, but once David had sought divination from the ephod that Abiathar possessed, he managed to persuade them to join him in a pursuit of the captors, as the divination was favourable. Six hundred men went in pursuit, but a third of them were too exhausted to go further than the HaBesor Stream. They found an abandoned and starving slave, formerly belonging to one of the Amalekites who had raided Ziklag, and having given him fig cake, raisin cake, and water, persuaded him to lead them to the Amalekite raiders. The slave led them to the camp of the captors, and found the captors holding a feast and celebrating, due to the size of their spoil; David's forces engaged in battle with them for a night and a day, and ultimately became victorious.

Textual scholars ascribe this narrative to the monarchial source of the Books of Samuel; the rival source, known as the republican source (named this due to its negative presentation of David, Saul, and other kings), does not at first glance appear to contain a similar narrative. The same narrative position is occupied in the republican source by the story of Nabal, who lived in the region south of Hebron (which includes the Negev). There are some similarities between the narratives, including David leading an army in revenge (for Nabal's unwillingness to give provisions to David), with 400 of the army going ahead and 200 staying behind, as well as David gaining Abigail as a wife (though in the Ziklag narrative he regains her), as well as several provisions, and there being a jovial feast in the enemy camp (i.e., Nabal's property). However, there are also several differences, such as the victory and provisions being obtained by Abigail's peaceful actions rather than a heroic victory by David, the 200 that stayed behind doing so to protect the baggage rather than due to exhaustion, the main secondary character being the wife of the enemy (Nabal) rather than their former slave, David's forces being joined by damsels rather than rejoining their wives, and Nabal rather than the Amalekites being the enemy.

The Books of Samuel go on to mention that as a result, the people taken by the Amalekites were released, and the spoil that the Amalekites had taken, including livestock, and spoil from attacks elsewhere, were divided among David's men, including the third that had remained at the Besor. This ruling, that even those left behind would get a share, is stated by the text to have been a response by David to those who believed only the two-thirds of David's men who had battled with the Amalekites should get a reward. Scholars believe that these rulings are derived from the decision in regard to the Amalekite spoil, rather than vice versa.

According to the text, once back at Ziklag, David sent portions of the spoil to the various community leaders within Judah; the text gives a list of the locations of the recipients, but they are all just within the Negev.

See also
Days of Ziklag, 1958 novel by Israeli author S. Yizhar

References

Bibliography
 Blakely, Jeffrey, "The Location of Medieval/Pre-Modern and Biblical Ziklag," Palestine Exploration Quarterly, 139,1 (2007), 21–26.

Hebrew Bible cities
Philistine cities
Casluhim
Kingdom of Judah
Negev